Surajpal Singh is an Indian politician and a member of the 16th Legislative Assembly of India. He represents the Fatehpur Sikri constituency of Uttar Pradesh and is a member of the Bahujan Samaj Party political party.

Early life and  education
Surajpal Singh was born in Agra district. He is educated till eighth grade and is a farmer by profession.

Political career
Surajpal Singh has been a MLA for two terms. He represented the Fatehpur Sikri constituency and is a member of the Bahujan Samaj Party political party. Singh was earlier a member of Apna Dal political party.

He lost his seat in the 2017 Uttar Pradesh Assembly election to Chau Udaybhan Singh of the Bharatiya Janata Party.

Posts held

See also 
 Fatehpur Sikri (Assembly constituency)
 Sixteenth Legislative Assembly of Uttar Pradesh
 Uttar Pradesh Legislative Assembly

References 

Apna Dal politicians
Bahujan Samaj Party politicians from Uttar Pradesh
Uttar Pradesh MLAs 2007–2012
Uttar Pradesh MLAs 2012–2017
People from Agra district
1960 births
Living people